The 1954 Irish general election to elect the 15th Dáil was held on Tuesday, 18 May, following the dissolution of the 14th Dáil on 24 April by President Seán T. O'Kelly on the request of Taoiseach Éamon de Valera. The general election took place in 40 Dáil constituencies throughout Ireland for 147 seats in Dáil Éireann, the house of representatives of the Oireachtas.

The 15th Dáil met at Leinster House on 2 June to nominate the Taoiseach for appointment by the president and to approve the appointment of a new government of Ireland. De Valera failed to secure a majority, and John A. Costello was appointed Taoiseach, forming the Second Inter-Party Government, a minority coalition of Fine Gael, the Labour Party and Clann na Talmhan.

Campaign
After the 1951 general election, Fianna Fáil had formed a minority single-party government. Shortly after the Minister for Finance, Seán McEntee, had delivered the 1954 budget, Éamon de Valera called a general election in the more of securing a stronger position.

Fianna Fáil had the most to lose, their campaign concentrated on providing political stability for the next five years. They also put forward strong arguments against coalition governments. However, this would not suffice when the country's economy was worsening and unemployment and emigration were increasing.

The opposition parties of Fine Gael, the Labour Party and the other minor parties offered the electorate an alternative to three years of Fianna Fáil rule.

Result

|}

Voting summary

Seats summary

Government formation
Fine Gael, the Labour Party and Clann na Talmhan formed the Second Inter-Party Government, a minority government, dependent on the support of Clann na Poblachta.

Changes in membership

First time TDs

Paudge Brennan
James Burke
Johnny Connor
Fintan Coogan Snr
Edward Cotter
Paddy Donegan
Nicholas Egan
Johnny Geoghegan
Brendan Glynn
Richard Gogan
Edward Kelly
Henry Kenny
Denis Larkin
Patrick Lindsay
Celia Lynch
John Moher
Maureen O'Carroll
John O'Donovan
Donogh O'Malley
James Tully

Outgoing TDs
Patrick Boland (Retired)
Patrick Browne (Lost seat)
Patrick Cawley (Lost seat)
Peadar Duignan (Retired)
Michael ffrench-O'Carroll (Lost seat)
Patrick Little (Retired)
Patrick Maguire (Retired)
Patrick O'Gorman (Lost seat)
Matthew O'Reilly (Lost seat)
James Reidy (Lost seat)
P. J. Ruttledge (Deceased)
Laurence Walsh (Lost seat)

See also
Members of the 8th Seanad

Notes

References

General election, 1954
1954
15th Dáil
General election
May 1954 events in Europe
1954 elections in Europe